The 1900–01 British Home Championship was an international football tournament between the British Home Nations. England won the competition with five points after strong victories over Wales and Ireland. Scotland too performed well, coming second with a win and two draws and racking up what remains their highest ever scoreline in an 11–0 demolition of the Irish in Glasgow.

Scotland's record win was the first match of the competition and saw hat-tricks by Sandy "Duke" McMahon and Robert Hamilton. In their second game however Scotland could not sustain their good form, resulting in a disappointing draw with a tough Welsh side who played well to gain their point. England entered the action next with a victory over the Irish, although the men in green limited the damage to just a three-goal deficit. England then took the lead in the competition with a heavy 6–0 win over Wales, Steve Bloomer scoring four. In the final matches, Ireland and Wales played for pride, neither side being able at this stage to win the trophy. Wales eventually won the match 1–0. England and Scotland however fought out a furious encounter as both sides stood a good chance of winning. However, by virtue of the Scottish draw with Wales, England needed only a draw to win the competition, a result they managed despite Scotland's resilience.

Table

Results

Winning squad

References

1901 in British sport
Brit
Brit
1900
Brit
Brit